Temperature range may refer to:

Atmospheric temperature
An aspect of climate classification
Diurnal temperature variation
Operating temperature
Temperature
Thermal amplitude of the human body
Thermoregulation